Koreasat 7 (also known as Mugunghwa 7) is a South Korean communications satellite operated by KT SAT, a subsidiary of KT Corporation. Thales Alenia Space was contracted in 2014 to build both it and Koreasat 5A. Koreasat 7A was launched into geosynchronous orbit on 4 May 2017 aboard an Ariane 5 ECA launch vehicle and placed at 116 degrees east longitude to provide coverage over East Asia.

References

Communications satellites
Satellites of South Korea
Spacecraft launched in 2017
2017 in South Korea
Satellites using the A2100 bus